Susan Lynn McElroy is Chief Research Officer at Lindner Center of HOPE.

Education and early career 
McElroy did her B.A. at Colgate University, Hamilton, and her M.D. at Cornell University Medical College, both in New York. This was followed by an internship in Internal Medicine at Columbia Presbyterian Hospital, and a residency in psychiatry at McLean Hospital, Massachusetts. She has also had fellowships at Cornell University Medical College, Harvard Medical School, and McLean Hospital.

Research 
McElroy's research interests include pharmacology, bipolar disorder, obesity, eating disorders, and impulse control disorders.

Other positions 
Linda and Harry Fath, Professor of Psychiatry
University of Cincinnati College of Medicine, Professor of Psychiatry and Neuroscience

Awards and honours 
Best Mental Health Experts by Good Housekeeping Magazine
Listing in Best Doctors in America, a peer-rated directory of the top one percent of physicians
Top Doctors in Cincinnati by Cincinnati Magazine
One of America's Top Psychiatrists, by the Consumers Research Council
Phillip L. Isenberg Teaching Award for "dedication and excellence in the education of residents", McLean Hospital and Harvard Medical School
Golden Apple Award for excellence in teaching of residents, University of Cincinnati College of Medicine
Co-recipient of the Gerald L. Klerman Young Investigator Award of the National Depressive and Manic Depressive Association, 1993

Selected publications

Journal articles
Hirschfeld, R., Williams, J., Spitzer, R., Calabrese, J., Flynn, L., Keck, P., Lewis, L., McElroy, S., Post, R., Rapport, D., Russell, J., Sachs, G., & Zajecka, J. (2000). Development and validation of a screening instrument for bipolar spectrum disorder: the Mood Disorder Questionnaire. The American journal of psychiatry, 157 11, 1873–5
McElroy, S., Keck, P., Pope, H., Smith, J., & Strakowski, S. (1994). Compulsive buying: a report of 20 cases. The Journal of clinical psychiatry, 55 6, 242–8
McElroy, S., Altshuler, L., Suppes, T., Keck, P., Frye, M., Denicoff, K., Nolen, W., Kupka, R., Leverich, G., Rochussen, J., Rush, A., & Post, R. (2001). Axis I psychiatric comorbidity and its relationship to historical illness variables in 288 patients with bipolar disorder. The American journal of psychiatry, 158 3, 420–6
McElroy, S., Arnold, L., Shapira, N., Keck, P., Rosenthal, N., Karim, M., Kamin, M., & Hudson, J. (2003). Topiramate in the treatment of binge eating disorder associated with obesity: a randomized, placebo-controlled trial. The American journal of psychiatry, 160 2, 255–61

Books
Authored or edited:

References

External links 
 
 Semantic Scholar Profile

Living people
American women physicians
American women psychiatrists
Year of birth missing (living people)
21st-century American women
Colgate University alumni